The cubital tunnel is a space of the dorsal medial elbow which allows passage of the ulnar nerve around the elbow. It is bordered medially by the medial epicondyle of the humerus, laterally by the olecranon process of the ulna and the tendinous arch joining the humeral and ulnar heads of the flexor carpi ulnaris. The roof of the cubital tunnel is elastic and formed by a myofascial trilaminar retinaculum (also known as the epicondyloolecranon ligament or Osborne band).

Chronic compression of this nerve is known as cubital tunnel syndrome, a form of repetitive strain injury akin to carpal tunnel syndrome (although the role of repetitive stress in causing carpal tunnel syndrome is controversial).

See also
 Ulnar nerve entrapment
 Froment's sign
 Medial epicondyle of the humerus

References

External links
 Image at University of Florida

Upper limb anatomy